813 is a 1920 American mystery film directed by Charles Christie and Scott Sidney, written by Scott Darling from the 1910 story by Maurice Leblanc, produced by Al Christie, released by the Christie Film Company and the Robertson-Cole Pictures Corporation, and starring Wedgwood Nowell as jewel thief Arsene Lupin with a supporting cast featuring Ralph Lewis, Wallace Beery, and Laura La Plante.

It is not known whether the film currently survives, and it may be a lost film.

Plot
As summarized in a film publication, Robert Castleback (Lewis) has plans for worldwide power through a mysterious secret that he possesses. Arsene Lupin (Nowell), master thief but loyal Frenchman, knows of the secret and is attempting to obtain state papers held by Castleback. Two other persons in the employ of the Kaiser are attempting the same thing. Castleback is murdered and some suspect Lupin, who announces his intention to catch the real killer. Disguised as the chief of police, he works fearlessly alongside the police. Soon he comes into contact with another master criminal, Ribeira (Beery), who is masquerading as Maj. Parbury, and Lupin suspects that he is complicit in the crime. Lupin falls in love with Dolores Castleback (Adams), widow of the murdered man. When Ribeira, to get rid of Lupin, steals his daughter and informs Lupin that he will have to go alone to a deserted house to get her back, Lupin goes, foils the plot to kill him, and escapes through a tunnel that comes out in the home of Delores. As he turns from the mantelpiece where he has discovered the hiding place of the state papers, he sees a mysterious man that he has been trailing. To Lupin's horror he finds that the man is really Delores, who is in reality a German criminal. She kills herself and Lupin escapes.

Cast
Wedgwood Nowell as Arsene Lupin
Ralph Lewis as Robert Castleback
Wallace Beery as Maj. Parbury / Ribeira
J.P. Lockney as Formerie
William V. Mong as Chapman
Colin Kenny as Gerard Beaupre
Milton Ross as Gourel
Thornton Edwards as Doudeville
Frederick Vroom as Prefect of Police
Mark Fenton as Marco
Kathryn Adams as Dolores Castleback
Laura La Plante as Genevieve
Vera Steadman as Vashti Seminoff
Gonzalo Meroño as Richard Steward

References

External links

 

1920 films
1920 mystery films
American silent feature films
American black-and-white films
Arsène Lupin films
American mystery films
Films directed by Scott Sidney
Film Booking Offices of America films
1920s American films
Silent adventure films
Silent mystery films